St. Mary's Convent College, often informally referred to simply as Ramnee, is an all-girls boarding school located in Nainital,  Kumaon at an altitude of  above MSL amidst the Kumaon Hills, that provides private school education to girls from prep. grades to XII under the ICSE board. The school was also, in discontinued usage, referred to as "Sonn". Students and alumnae are known colloquially as "Ramneeites".

History
Established by Mother Salesia Reiner in 1878, St. Mary's Convent is a Roman Catholic institution superintended by Sisters belonging to the CJ(Congregation of Jesus) order founded as Institute of the Blessed Virgin Mary (until 2003), by Mother Mary Ward, an English lady, in the 17th century. The sisters of this Congregation started working in Patna, Bihar in 1853. Mother Salesia Reiner, then Mother Superior of St. Joseph's Convent Patna, opened a foundation in Nainital.

Nainital was the summer capital of the North Western Provinces and during the summer was frequented by tourists as well as civil and military officials. The presence of the sisters made education more convenient for both the local people and regular visitors. After overcoming the initial difficulties, a team of 8 sisters started a school with a few day-scholars in the month of May 1878. By the end of the year, the school had 40 boarders and a number of day-scholars.

Sports and activities
Basketball, volleyball and badminton are the principal games. A wide range of cultural and co-curricular activities are available like the martial art Muay Thai. Each student takes part in the annual sports event which generally takes place in May. Traditionally, the school has four houses:

Notable alumni 

 Meera Shankar, former Ambassador of India to the United States
 Meenakshi Sargogi, Sugar Industrialist and Padma Shri Awardee
 Nuzhat Husain, former director of Dr. Ram Manohar Lohia Institute of Medical Sciences
Sukirti Kandpal (actress) 
Vandana Shiva (Indian activist) 
Hiroo Johar (Film producer)
Apurva Pandey (IAS officer)

References

External links
Official website

Catholic boarding schools in India
High schools and secondary schools in Uttarakhand
Boarding schools in Uttarakhand
Christian schools in Uttarakhand
Girls' schools in Uttarakhand
Education in Nainital
Educational institutions established in 1878
1878 establishments in India
Girls boarding schools